Raising Hell may refer to:

"Raising Hell" (Bullet for My Valentine song), 2013
"Raising Hell" (Kesha song), 2019
Raising Hell (album), by Run-D.M.C.
Raising Hell, an album by Fatback Band
Raising Hell (book), by David Weir and Dan Noyes
Raising Hell (video), a concert video by Iron Maiden
 Raising Hell Software, the original name of the British video game studio Bizarre Creations
Overlord: Raising Hell, an expansion pack to the 2007 video game Overlord